Sprinkler fitting is an occupation consisting of the installing, testing, inspecting, and certifying of  automatic fire suppression systems in all types of structures. Sprinkler systems installed by sprinkler fitters can include the underground supply as well as integrated  systems and standpipes. The fire suppression piping may contain water, air (in a dry system), antifreeze, gas or chemicals as in a hood system, or a mixture producing fire retardant foam.

Sprinkler fitters work with a variety of pipe and tubing materials including several types of plastic, copper, steel, cast iron, and ductile iron.

Sprinkler fitters specialize in piping associated with fire sprinkler systems. The piping within these types of systems are required to be installed and maintained in accordance with strict guidelines in order to maintain compliance with the local building code and the fire code. This type of fire protection is considered a part of active fire protection rather than passive fire protection.

Local and national standards

In the US, fire protection systems must adhere to the standards set forth in the installation standards of NFPA 13, (NFPA) 13D,(NFPA) 13R, (NFPA 14) and (NFPA) 25which are administered, copyrighted, and published by the National Fire Protection Association.

See also
Active fire protection
Automatic fire suppression
Fire sprinkler system
Piping and plumbing fitting

References

External links
National Fire Sprinkler Association
American Fire Sprinkler Association
Home Fire Sprinkler Coalition
British Standards Institute

Construction trades workers
Piping
Active fire protection
Fire suppression